Jerry Hey (born 1950) is an American trumpeter, flugelhornist, horn arranger, string arranger, orchestrator and session musician who has played on hundreds of commercial recordings, including Michael Jackson's Thriller, Rock with You, Don’t Stop ‘Til You Get Enough, Workin’ Day and Night and the flugelhorn solo on Dan Fogelberg's hit "Longer". Additionally, he has performed with artists such as George Benson, Nik Kershaw, Al Jarreau, Barbra Streisand, Donna Summer, Earth, Wind & Fire, Whitney Houston, Frank Sinatra, George Duke, Lionel Richie, Rufus and Chaka Kahn, Natalie Cole, Aretha Franklin, Patti Austin, among many others.

He is known as the Seawind trumpeter and arranger who plays with Gary Grant, Larry Williams and Bill Reichenbach Jr..

Biography 
Jerry Hey was born in 1950 in Dixon, Illinois to a family of musicians. His mother was a pianist and his father was a trombonist. Jerry also had two older brothers who played the trombone and tuba. After completing high school, Jerry attended the National Music Camp for two summers. While in college, Hey studied under Bill Adam at Indiana University.

Jerry then relocated to Hawaii to become a member of Seawind band.

In 1976, Jerry Hey moved to Los Angeles with the Seawind and recorded two albums for CTI Records under the direction of Harvey Mason.

When Jerry Hey and Seawind moved to Los Angeles, Gary Grant had already been in the city for a year and was a well-known session player. He invited Jerry to join him on recording sessions, which helped to launch Jerry's career as a studio musician.

Soon after arriving in LA, Quincy Jones got in touch with Jerry to ask him to play and arrange for an album titled “I Heard That!!”. Following that session, Jerry and his associates were invited to perform on every one of Quincy's recordings. Hey later worked as a musician and arranger with David Foster.

Jerry is the uncle of American keyboardist, songwriter, producer, arranger and musical director Henry Hey.

He composed and arranged the song "Jedi Rocks" for the 1997 Special Edition re-release of Return of the Jedi. He co-produced four songs on Lisa Stansfield's 2014 album, Seven.

Hey has received 6 Grammy Awards and 11 nominations.

Awards

Grammy Awards 
1981 – Best Instrumental Arrangement
Jerry Hey & Quincy Jones (arrangers) for "Dinorah, Dinorah" performed by George Benson
1982 – Best Instrumental Arrangement Accompanying Vocal(s)
Jerry Hey & Quincy Jones (arrangers) for "Ai No Corrida" performed by Quincy Jones
1983 – Best Instrumental Arrangement Accompanying Vocal(s)
Jerry Hey & David Paich, Jeff Porcaro (arrangers) for "Rosanna" performed by Toto
1984 – Best Album of Original Score Written for a Motion Picture or A Television Special
Michael Boddicker, Irene Cara, Kim Carnes, Douglas Cotler, Keith Forsey, Richard Gilbert, Jerry Hey, Duane Hitchings, Craig Krampf, Ronald Magness, Dennis Matkosky, Giorgio Moroder, Phil Ramone, Michael Sembello, Shandi Sinnamon (composers) for Flashdance performed by various artists
1991 – Best Arrangement on an Instrumental
Jerry Hey, Quincy Jones, Ian Prince & Rod Temperton (arrangers) for "Birdland" performed by Quincy Jones.
1991 - Best Instrumental Arrangement Accompanying Vocal(s)
Glen Ballard, Jerry Hey, Quincy Jones & Clif Magness (arrangers) for "The Places You Find Love" performed by Quincy Jones.

Discography 

With Earth, Wind & Fire
 I Am (Columbia, 1979)
 Faces (Columbia, 1980)
 Raise! (Columbia, 1981)
 Powerlight (Columbia, 1983)
 Electric Universe (Columbia, 1983)
 Touch the World (Columbia, 1987)
 Heritage (Columbia, 1990)
 Millennium (Warner Bros., 1993)
 In the Name of Love (Rhino, 1997)
 The Promise (Kalimba, 2003)
 Illumination (Sanctuary, 2005)
 Now, Then & Forever (Legacy, 2013)
 Holiday (Legacy, 2014)

With The Brothers Johnson
 Blam! (A&M Records, 1978)
 Light Up The Night (A&M Records, 1980)
 Winners (A&M Records, 1981)
 Blast! (A&M Records, 1982)

With Luis Miguel
 Soy Como Quiero Ser (Warner, 1987)
 Busca una Mujer (Warner, 1988)
 20 Años (Warner, 1990)
 Aries (Warner, 1993)
 Segundo Romance (Warner, 1994)
 Nada Es Igual (Warner, 1996)
 Amarte Es Un Placer (Warner, 1999)
 Mis Romances (Warner, 2001)
 33 (Warner, 2003)
 Cómplices (Warner, 2008)
 Luis Miguel (Warner, 2010)
With Lalo Schifrin
 No One Home (Tabu, 1979)
With Aretha Franklin
 Love All the Hurt Away (Arista, 1981)
 Jump to It (Arista, 1982)
 Aretha (Arista, 1986)
With Elton John
 21 at 33 (Rocket, 1980)
 Duets (Rocket, 1993)
With Olivia Newton-John
 The Rumour (Mercury, 1988)
With Bob Seger
 Like a Rock (Capitol, 1986)
With Kenny Rogers
 The Heart of the Matter (RCA, 1985)
With Syreeta Wright
 Set My Love in Motion (Tamla, 1981)
With Joe Cocker
 Across from Midnight (CMC, 1997)
With Cher
 Prisoner (Casablanca, 1979)
With Dionne Warwick
 Friends in Love (Arista, 1982)
With Cheryl Lynn
 In Love (Columbia, 1979)
 Start Over (Manhattan, 1987)
With Celine Dion
 Falling into You (Columbia, 1996)
With Jon Anderson
 In the City of Angels (Columbia, 1988)
With Patti LaBelle
 Winner in You (MCA, 1986)
With Shelby Lynne
 Love, Shelby (Island, 2001)
With Thelma Houston
 Breakwater Cat (RCA, 1980)
With Selena
 Dreaming of You (EMI, 1995)
With Barry Manilow
 Swing Street (Arista, 1987)
With Taylor Dayne
 Can't Fight Fate (Arista, 1989)
With Patti Austin
 Patti Austin (Qwest, 1984)
 The Real Me (Qwest, 1988)
 That Secret Place (GRP, 1994)
 On the Way to Love (Warner Bros., 2001)
With Michael Bolton
 Time, Love & Tenderness (Columbia, 1991)
 This Is The Time: The Christmas Album (Columbia, 1996)
With Jeffrey Osborne
 Jeffrey Osborne (A&M, 1982)
 Stay with Me Tonight (A&M, 1983)
 One Love: One Dream (A&M, 1988)
With Lisa Stansfield
 Real Love (Arista, 1991)
 Lisa Stansfield (Arista, 1997)
With Anita Baker
 Rhythm of Love (Elektra, 1994)
 My Everything (Blue Note, 2004)
With Stevie Nicks
 The Other Side of the Mirror (Modern, 1989)
With Christopher Cross
 Every Turn of the World (Warner Bros., 1985)
With Dan Fogelberg
 Phoenix (Epic, 1979)
 The Innocent Age (Epic, 1981)
 The Wild Places (Epic, 1990)
With Tanya Tucker
 Should I Do It (MCA Records, 1981)
With David Crosby
 Oh Yes I Can (A&M, 1989)
With Kenny Loggins
 Back to Avalon (Columbia, 1988)
With Minnie Riperton
 Minnie (Capitol, 1979)
With Steve Cropper
 Playin' My Thang (MCA, 1981)
With Brenda Russell
 Brenda Russell (Horizon, 1979)
 Two Eyes (Warner Bros., 1983)
With Stephanie Mills
 Home (MCA, 1989)
With Joni Mitchell
 Dog Eat Dog (Geffen, 1985)
With Melissa Manchester
 Emergency (Arista, 1983)
 Mathematics (MCA, 1985)
With Jim Messina
 Messina (Warner Bros., 1981)
With Deniece Williams
 Hot on the Trail (Columbia, 1986)
 As Good as It Gets (Columbia, 1988)
 Special Love (Sparrow, 1989)
With Teena Marie
 Lady T (Gordy, 1980)
With Peter Allen
 Bi-Coastal (A&M, 1980)
 Not The Boy Next Door (Arista, 1983)
With Beth Hart
 Leave the Light On (Warner Bros., 2003)
With Donna Summer
 Bad Girls (Casablanca, 1979)
 Donna Summer (Geffen, 1982)
 She Works Hard for the Money (Mercury, 1983)
 All Systems Go (Geffen, 1987)
With Paul Anka
 The Music Man (United Artists, 1976)
With Chaka Khan
 What Cha' Gonna Do for Me (Warner Bros., 1981)
With Barry Mann
 Barry Mann (Casablanca, 1980)
With Melanie C
 Reason (Virgin, 2003)
With Sheena Easton
 A Private Heaven (EMI, 1984)
With John Mayer
 Heavier Things (Columbia, 2003)
 The Search for Everything (Columbia, 2017)
With Dolly Parton
 Heartbreaker (RCA Victor, 1978)
 9 to 5 and Odd Jobs (RCA, 1980)
With Boz Scaggs
 Other Roads (Columbia, 1988)
With Randy Crawford
 Windsong (Warner Bros., 1982)
With Rickie Lee Jones
 Pirates (Warner Bros., 1981)
 The Magazine (Warner Bros., 1984)
 The Evening of My Best Day (V2, 2003)
With Carole Bayer Sager
 ...Too (Elektra, 1978)
 Sometimes Late at Night (The Boardwalk Entertainment, 1981)
With Paul McCartney
 Pipes of Peace (Columbia, 1983)
With Michael McDonald
 No Lookin' Back (Warner Bros., 1985)
With Michael Jackson
 Off the Wall (Epic, 1979)
 Thriller (Epic, 1982)
 Bad (Epic, 1987)
With Desmond Child
 Discipline (Elektra, 1991)
With Betty Wright
 Betty Wright (Epic, 1981)
With Roberta Flack
 Oasis (Atlantic, 1988)
With Richard Marx
 Richard Marx (EMI, 1987)
 Repeat Offender (EMI, 1989)
 Flesh and Bone (Capitol, 1997)
With Mika
 The Boy Who Knew Too Much (Casablanca, 2009)
With Philip Bailey
 Continuation (A&M, 1983)
With Rod Stewart
 Camouflage (Warner Bros., 1984)
With Randy Newman
 Trouble in Paradise (Reprise, 1983)
 Land of Dreams (Reprise, 1988)
With Natalie Cole
 Dangerous (Atco, 1985)
 Everlasting (Elektra, 1987)
With B.B. King
 B.B. King & Friends: 80 (Geffen, 2005)
With Peter Cetera
 World Falling Down (Warner Bros., 1992)
With Nicolette Larson
 In the Nick of Time (Warner Bros. Records, 1979)
With Barbra Streisand
 Songbird (Columbia, 1978)
 Till I Loved You (Columbia, 1988)
With Jennifer Warnes
 The Hunter (Attic, 1992)
With Rob Thomas
 ...Something to Be (Atlantic Records, 2005)
With Laura Branigan
 Hold Me (Atlantic, 1985)
With Jimmy Webb
 Angel Heart (Real West Production, 1982)
With Al Jarreau
 This Time (Warner Bros., 1980)
 Breakin' Away (Warner Bros., 1981)
 Jarreau (Warner Bros., 1983)
 High Crime (Warner Bros., 1984)
 Heart's Horizon (Reprise, 1988)
 Heaven and Earth (Reprise, 1992)
 Tomorrow Today (GRP, 2000)
 All I Got (GRP, 2002)
With Jennifer Holliday
 Feel My Soul (Geffen, 1983)

With James Last Band
 Seduction (Polydor, 1980)

With George Benson
 Give Me the Night (Warner Bros., 1980)
 20/20 (Warner Bros., 1985)
 While the City Sleeps... (Warner Bros., 1986)
 Standing Together (GRP, 1998)
With Livingston Taylor
 Three Way Mirror (Epic, 1978)
With Neil Diamond
 September Morn (Columbia, 1979)
 The Best Years of Our Lives (Columbia, 1988)
With Michael Franks
 One Bad Habit (Warner Bros., 1980)
With Atkins
 Atkins (also does the horn section on Keep Trying) (Warner Bros., 1982)
With Darren Kramer Organization
 The Darren Kramer Organization (1998)

With Tom Petty and the Heartbreakers
 Southern Accents (MCA Records, 1985)
 Playback (MCA Records, 1995)

With Miho Nakayama
 Wagamama na Actress (King Records, 1993)
 Mid Blue (King Records, 1995)

With Pauline Wilson
 Tribute (McClees Corp., 2001)

With The Square/T-SQUARE
 R･E･S･O･R･T (CBS/Sony, 1985)
 Yes, No (CBS/Sony, 1988)
 Refreshest (Sony, 1991)

With Dave Weckl/Dave Weckl Band
 Master Plan (GRP, 1990)
 Live (and very plugged in) (Stretch, 2003)

With David Foster
 David Foster (Atlantic, 1986)
 The Christmas Album (Interscope Records, 1995)

With Wilson Phillips
 Shadows And Light (SBK Records, 1992)

Soundtracks 
As sideman on soundtrack recordings

 Aladdin soundtrack (Walt Disney, 1992)
 Ally McBeal soundtrack (1997-2002)
 Analyze This soundtrack (1999)
 Austin Powers I, Austin Powers II, Austin Powers III (2002) soundtrack
 Back to the Future soundtrack (MCA, 1985)
 Back to the Future Part II soundtrack (1989)
 Back to the Future Part III soundtrack (1990)
 BAD short film soundtrack (1987)
 Bad Boys soundtrack (1983)
 Blown Away soundtrack (1994)
 Bowfinger soundtrack (1999)
 Big Trouble soundtrack (2002)
 Bridge to Terabithia soundtrack (2006)
 Captain EO short film soundtrack (1986)
 Caddyshack soundtrack (1980)
 Contact soundtrack
 CHiPs soundtrack (1977-1983)
 Disney features - Hercules (1997), Blast from the Past (1998), Little Mermaid (1989), Beauty and the Beast (1991), Isn’t She Great (1999) soundtracks
 Father of the Bride I and Father of the Bride II soundtrack
 Fandango soundtrack (1984)
 Forrest Gump soundtrack
 George of the Jungle soundtrack (Walt Disney, 1997)
 Grand Canyon soundtrack (1991)
 Godzilla soundtrack (Epic, 1998)
 Grumpy Old Men and Grumpier Old Men soundtrack
 Gypsy soundtrack (1993)
 Lilo & Stitch soundtrack (Walt Disney, 2002)
 Men in Black II soundtrack (Columbia, 2002)
 Meet the Applegates soundtrack (1990)
 Meet the Fockers soundtrack (2004)
 Meet the Browns soundtrack (2008)
 Mousehunt soundtrack (Varese Sarabande, 1997)
 Mulan soundtrack (Walt Disney, 1998)
 Payback soundtrack (1998)
 Paternity soundtrack (Kritzerland, 2014)
 Pocahontas soundtrack (Walt Disney, 1995)
 Predator soundtrack (Varèse Sarabande, 1987)
 Pretty Woman soundtrack (EMI, 1990)
 Running Scared soundtrack (MCA, 1986)
 Romeo Must Die soundtrack (2000)
 Rocky II soundtrack (United Artists/EMI, 1979)
 Rocky III soundtrack (Liberty, 1982)
 Rocky IV soundtrack (Scotti Bros., 1985)
 Reindeer Games soundtrack
 Shrek Forever After soundtrack (DGC, 2010)
 Spacejam soundtrack (Warner, 1996)
 Spiderman 2 soundtrack (Sony, 2004)
 Star Wars Episode VIII: The Last Jedi soundtrack (Walt Disney, 2017)
 Stuart Little soundtrack (Motown, 1999)
 Superbad soundtrack (Lakeshore, 2007)
 Sister Act I & Sister Act II soundtrack
 Sudden Impact soundtrack (1983)
 The Adventures of Pluto Nash soundtrack (Beverly, 2002)
 The Karate Kid Part II soundtrack (Warner Bros., 1986)
 The Polar Express soundtrack (Reprise, 2004)
 The Ugly Truth soundtrack (Lakeshore, 2009)
 The Bodyguard soundtrack (1992)
 The Color Purple soundtrack (1985)
 The Odd Couple II soundtrack
 The Notebook soundtrack (2004)
 The Shadow soundtrack (1994)
 Waterboy soundtrack (1998)
 Waiting to Exhale soundtrack (2000)
 Return to Me soundtrack (Sony Legacy, 2000)
 What Lies Beneath soundtrack (Varese Sarabande, 2000)
 Who Framed Roger Rabbit? soundtrack (Buena Vista, 1988)
 Judge Dredd / Expanded Original Motion Picture Score soundtrack (1995)
 Young Guns II soundtrack (Intrada Special Collection, 2011)
 Fandango soundtrack (Intrada Special Collection, 1984)
 Blown Away soundtrack (Intrada Special Collection, 1994)

References

External links 
 
 
 

1950 births
Living people
American session musicians
American male trumpeters
Grammy Award winners
Male trumpeters
American male jazz musicians
21st-century trumpeters
21st-century American male musicians
20th-century trumpeters
20th-century American male musicians
Seawind (band) members
Omega Tribe (Japanese band) members